Jason Harshbarger (born November 27, 1974) is an American politician who served in the West Virginia House of Delegates from the 7th district from 2016 to 2019.

On August 14, 2019, he announced that he was resigning from the legislature to become a lobbyist for Dominion Resources.

References

1974 births
Living people
Republican Party members of the West Virginia House of Delegates
21st-century American politicians